Francesco Fornabaio (5 March 1957 – 21 September 2014 ) was an Italian aviator and aerobatic pilot.

Birth 
Fornabaio was born in Stigliano.

Death 
Fornabaio was killed in plane crash at the "Fly Venice" air show at Lido di Venezia.

References

See also 

 List of air show accidents and incidents in the 21st century

1957 births
2014 deaths
Italian aviators
21st-century Italian people
Aerobatic pilots
Aviators killed in aviation accidents or incidents in Italy
Victims of aviation accidents or incidents in 2014